The Herefordshire Beacon is one of the highest peaks of the Malvern Hills, and is high enough to be classified as a mountain. It is surrounded by a British Iron Age hill fort earthwork known as British Camp. The fort subsequently had a ringwork and bailey castle built inside its boundary and there is evidence of 120 huts in the area. British Camp has been a scheduled monument since 1923.

Geography
It is within the county of Herefordshire, but is directly adjacent to the border with Worcestershire to the east.

British Camp

Atop Herefordshire Beacon, there is an Iron Age hill fort, known as British Camp, and would have held a settlement between 4th century BCE and 1st century CE. A ringwork and bailey castle was built within the site of the hill fort, and there is evidence of 120 huts having been built within the boundaries of the fort. The hill fort received scheduled monument status on 10 August 1923.

Nearby to British Camp, on the eastern slope of Herefordshire Beacon, there is a reservoir called British Camp Reservoir. In 2017, Severn Trent proposed to dismantle the treatment plant associated with the reservoir and drain it, leaving an  pond.

References

External links

Hills of Herefordshire
Malvern Hills